The Gesualdo Six are a British vocal consort, directed by Owain Park. The group was founded in Cambridge in 2014 for a performance of the Tenebrae Responsories for Maundy Thursday by Carlo Gesualdo, in the chapel of Trinity College. The Gesualdo Six perform a wide range of music from the middle ages to the present day.

The ensemble were St John's Smith Square Young Artists for the 2015-2016 season, and in partnership with St John's Smith Square and the Music Sales Group, curated a composition competition in 2016, which attracted over 170 entries from across the globe. A second composition competition in 2018 attracted over 300 entries.

In 2018, the ensemble toured Canada, performing in seven cities.

Recordings 
In 2018, The Gesualdo Six released their debut album, English Motets, on the Hyperion label. The CD features works from the English Renaissance by composers including Dunstaple, Cornysh, Byrd, Tallis, Tomkins, Sheppard and Morley. The CD was selected for the quarterly  by the German Record Critics' Awards in August 2018.

A second CD, Christmas, was released in November 2019, again on the Hyperion label. It was selected as The Times 'Album of the Week' for 15 December 2019. Their third and most recent album, Fading, was released in March 2020.

References

External links
 The Gesualdo Six – Official website
 The Gesualdo Six – YouTube channel
 

A cappella musical groups
Early music groups
British early music ensembles
British vocal groups